Wesley Theodorus Hoedt (born 6 March 1994) is a Dutch professional footballer who plays as a centre back for English Championship club Watford.

Career

AZ
Hoedt was born in Alkmaar and is a product of the youth academy from AZ. On 12 December 2013, he made his first-team debut for AZ in the UEFA Europa League against PAOK. He played the full game, which ended in a 2–2 draw.

For the 2014–15 season, Hoedt was promoted to the first team and named in the 24-man squad for the forthcoming season.

Lazio
Following Hoedt's departure from AZ in 2015, Serie A club Lazio signed him on a free transfer. The player signed a four-year contract worth €1.25m per season. He scored his first goal for the club on 21 August 2016 in a 4–3 away win over Atalanta.

Southampton
On 22 August 2017, Hoedt signed for Southampton on a five-year deal reported to be €17 million (£15 million).

Celta Vigo (loan)
Hoedt joined La Liga club Celta Vigo on 22 January 2019 on loan until the end of the season, with an option to purchase. He made his debut on 27 January in an away game against Real Valladolid where he was booked twice and sent off.

Royal Antwerp (loan)
Hoedt joined Belgian First Division A club Royal Antwerp on loan for the rest of the 2019–20 season on 2 September 2019.

Lazio (loan)
On 5 October 2020, Hoedt returned to Lazio on a season-long loan deal with an option to buy.

Anderlecht
On 17 June 2021, Anderlecht announced the signing of Hoedt on their official website.

Watford
On 31 January 2023, Watford confirmed the signing of Hoedt from Anderlecht on a two-and-a-half-year deal for an undisclosed fee. He scored on his debut for Watford in a 1-1 draw with Blackburn Rovers on 11 February 2023.

Career statistics

Club

International

Honours
Lazio
Supercoppa Italiana: 2017
Coppa Italia runner-up: 2016–17

References

External links

Wesley Hoedt profile at the Southampton F.C. website

Voetbal International profile 
AZ official website profile 
Netherlands profile
 Wesley Hoedt Interview

1993 births
Living people
Sportspeople from Alkmaar
Dutch footballers
Netherlands youth international footballers
Netherlands under-21 international footballers
Netherlands international footballers
Association football defenders
AZ Alkmaar players
S.S. Lazio players
Southampton F.C. players
RC Celta de Vigo players
Royal Antwerp F.C. players
R.S.C. Anderlecht players
Eredivisie players
Serie A players
Premier League players
La Liga players
Belgian Pro League players
Dutch expatriate footballers
Expatriate footballers in England
Expatriate footballers in Italy
Expatriate footballers in Spain
Dutch expatriate sportspeople in England
Dutch expatriate sportspeople in Italy
Dutch expatriate sportspeople in Spain
HVV Hollandia players
Footballers from North Holland